Big House Bunny is a 1950 Warner Bros. Looney Tunes short directed by Friz Freleng. The cartoon was released on April 22, 1950, and stars Bugs Bunny and Yosemite Sam.

Plot 
Needing to get away from hunters, Bugs digs a tunnel and accidentally winds up in Sing Song Prison (a clear reference to Sing Sing Prison; "No Hanging Around").  As he tries settling himself to his hiding spot, prison guard Yosemite Sam (here called Sam Schultz) beats Bugs with a billy club, telling him, "Trying to pull an escape, 777174, huh?" to which Bugs replies, "I'm not 777174 - I'm only 3½."

Sam believes that, but he does not believe that Bugs is not a prisoner.  Thus, Bugs is arrested, attired accordingly, numbered 3½, and sent to the rock pile ("Neh, my mother told me there'd be days like this.") When Sam smugly tells Bugs that he will be locked up in jail for 50 years (though it is not specified why, the crimes committed in Rebel Rabbit, or whatever offense got the unseen #777174 incarcerated are two possible reasons), Bugs quickly comes up with an escape plan. He screams that a prisoner is escaping and points into the distance, allowing himself time to insert his chain ball into a cannon when Sam is not looking.  
A few seconds later, Sam fires the cannon to shoot down the "escaping prisoner", sending Bugs over the wall to freedom. However, it does not take long for Sam to get wise; he drives a police car out of the prison and recaptures Bugs.

For his attempted escape, Sam punishes Bugs by ordering him to be confined in his jail cell. When Sam locks Bugs inside, Bugs pulls a switch so that Sam is tricked into locking himself in the cell and freeing Bugs.

Sam breaks out and holds Bugs at gunpoint, threatening Bugs with solitary confinement for 99 years. Bugs quickly pulls another switcheroo by telling Sam that a really tough person would not use his uniform to intimidate another ("Eh, you wouldn't be so tough if you weren't wearing that uniform!") and challenges him to a "fight". Accepting the challenge, Sam takes his uniform off and levels his fists at Bugs, who has taken off his prison outfit. Bugs quickly admits to Sam that he IS tough without his uniform and they redress, with Bugs putting on the police uniform and Sam absentmindedly putting on the prison outfit, after which Bugs blows a whistle and Sam, realizing too late that he has been tricked again, is beaten up by several correction officers for "trying to escape" and thrown into a jail cell.

Inside his cell, Sam throws a tantrum and demands a "habus corpeas". Bugs, who is having too much fun outsmarting Sam to leave, pretends to be a sympathetic guard and gives Sam a loaf of bread, which is an "Ajax Escape Kit" containing a shovel, pickaxe, jackhammer, and map ("I'm getting ya out of here, see? I haven't forgotten what you've done for Mary an' the kids, see?"). Sam starts digging and comes up in what appears to be a jungle but is really many oversized plants... in the warden's office. The warden scolds Sam for fooling around, gives him a new officer's uniform and dismisses him from his office. ("I won't stand for any more of your nonsense! Now get out! OUT!!") Resuming his pursuit of Bugs, Sam chases him up a ladder to the gallows. As Bugs escapes through the trap door, Sam falls in and accidentally hangs himself (but does not die due to cartoon logic). As Sam angrily rants at this latest failure, he is called upon by the warden, who is Bugs in disguise. The faux warden tricks Sam into sitting on an electric chair and zapping him with electricity, but then Bugs' fake mustache slips off, exposing the ruse. Sam chases Bugs out of the warden's office, around the prison and seemingly right back into the office, where he whacks whom he thinks is Bugs over the head with a billy club, only to find that he has clubbed the REAL warden, who warns Sam that he will be fired if he makes one more mistake. ("I've had all the tomfoolery I'm gonna take from you! QUIET!! One more slip, you strudel-brained bonehead, and you'll be looking for another job! Now get out! OUT!!")

Having had his fill of Bugs, Sam stops Bugs at gunpoint, opens the prison gate and orders Bugs to leave the grounds. Bugs walks out and Sam celebrates, but the warden ("SCHULTZ! OFFICE!"), outraged by his actions, arrests and imprisons him for allowing a prisoner to escape (which is a false conviction, since Bugs was never a prisoner to begin with). Sam, now in prison garb for real, groans about his predicament at the rock pile as punishment and asks "I'd like to know what dirty stool pigeon squealed on me". Nearby, a grinning Bugs (implying that he was the one who ratted out Sam) acts like a pigeon while standing on a stool.

Home media
Big House Bunny is available, uncensored and uncut, on Looney Tunes Golden Collection: Volume 1, Disc 1.

See also 
List of Bugs Bunny cartoons
List of Yosemite Sam cartoons

References

External links 

 

1950 films
1950 animated films
1950 short films
Looney Tunes shorts
Warner Bros. Cartoons animated short films
Short films directed by Friz Freleng
Films scored by Carl Stalling
American prison comedy films
Bugs Bunny films
1950s Warner Bros. animated short films
Yosemite Sam films
1950s English-language films